In astronautics, a powered flyby, or Oberth maneuver, is a maneuver in which a spacecraft falls into a gravitational well and then uses its engines to further accelerate as it is falling, thereby achieving additional speed. The resulting maneuver is a more efficient way to gain kinetic energy than applying the same impulse outside of a gravitational well. The gain in efficiency is explained by the Oberth effect, wherein the use of a reaction engine at higher speeds generates a greater change in mechanical energy than its use at lower speeds. In practical terms, this means that the most energy-efficient method for a spacecraft to burn its fuel is at the lowest possible orbital periapsis, when its orbital velocity (and so, its kinetic energy) is greatest. In some cases, it is even worth spending fuel on slowing the spacecraft into a gravity well to take advantage of the efficiencies of the Oberth effect. The maneuver and effect are named after the person who first described them in 1927, Hermann Oberth, an Austro-Hungarian-born German physicist and a founder of modern rocketry.

Because the vehicle remains near periapsis only for a short time, for the Oberth maneuver to be most effective the vehicle must be able to generate as much impulse as possible in the shortest possible time. As a result the Oberth maneuver is much more useful for high-thrust rocket engines like liquid-propellant rockets, and less useful for low-thrust reaction engines such as ion drives, which take a long time to gain speed. The Oberth effect also can be used to understand the behavior of multi-stage rockets: the upper stage can generate much more usable kinetic energy than the total chemical energy of the propellants it carries.

In terms of the energies involved, the Oberth effect is more effective at higher speeds because at high speed the propellant has significant kinetic energy in addition to its chemical potential energy. At higher speed the vehicle is able to employ the greater change (reduction) in kinetic energy of the propellant (as it is exhausted backward and hence at reduced speed and hence reduced kinetic energy) to generate a greater increase in kinetic energy of the vehicle.

Explanation in terms of momentum and kinetic energy
A rocket works by transferring momentum to its propellant. At a fixed exhaust velocity, this will be a fixed amount of momentum per unit of propellant. For a given mass of rocket (including remaining propellant), this implies a fixed change in velocity per unit of propellant. Because kinetic energy equals mv2/2, this change in velocity imparts a greater increase in kinetic energy at a high velocity than it would at a low velocity. For example, considering a 2 kg rocket:
 at 1 m/s, the rocket starts with 12 = 1 J of kinetic energy. Adding 1 m/s increases the kinetic energy to 22 = 4 J, for a gain of 3 J;
 at 10 m/s, the rocket starts with 102 = 100 J of kinetic energy. Adding 1 m/s increases the kinetic energy to 112 = 121 J, for a gain of 21 J.

This greater change in kinetic energy can then carry the rocket higher in the gravity well than if the propellant were burned at a lower speed.

Description in terms of work
Rocket engines produce the same force regardless of their velocity. A rocket acting on a fixed object, as in a static firing, does no useful work at all; the rocket's stored energy is entirely expended on accelerating its propellant in the form of exhaust. But when the rocket moves, its thrust acts through the distance it moves. Force multiplied by distance is the definition of mechanical energy or work. So the farther the rocket and payload move during the burn (i.e. the faster they move), the greater the kinetic energy imparted to the rocket and its payload and the less to its exhaust.

This is shown as follows. The mechanical work done on the rocket  is defined as the dot product of the force of the engine's thrust  and the displacement it travels during the burn 
 

If the burn is made in the prograde direction,  The work results in a change in kinetic energy
 

Differentiating with respect to time, we obtain 
 
or
 
where  is the velocity. Dividing by the instantaneous mass  to express this in terms of specific energy  we get 
 
where  is the acceleration vector.

Thus it can be readily seen that the rate of gain of specific energy of every part of the rocket is proportional to speed and, given this, the equation can be integrated (numerically or otherwise) to calculate the overall increase in specific energy of the rocket.

Impulsive burn
Integrating the above energy equation is often unnecessary if the burn duration is short. Short burns of chemical rocket engines close to periapsis or elsewhere are usually mathematically modeled as impulsive burns, where the force of the engine dominates any other forces that might change the vehicle's energy over the burn.

For example, as a vehicle falls toward periapsis in any orbit (closed or escape orbits) the velocity relative to the central body increases. Briefly burning the engine (an “impulsive burn”) prograde at periapsis increases the velocity by the same increment as at any other time. However, since the vehicle's kinetic energy is related to the square of its velocity, this increase in velocity has a non-linear effect on the vehicle's kinetic energy, leaving it with higher energy than if the burn were achieved at any other time.

Oberth calculation for a parabolic orbit
If an impulsive burn of Δv is performed at periapsis in a parabolic orbit, then the velocity at periapsis before the burn is equal to the escape velocity (Vesc), and the specific kinetic energy after the burn is
 
where .

When the vehicle leaves the gravity field, the loss of specific kinetic energy is
 
so it retains the energy
 
which is larger than the energy from a burn outside the gravitational field by
 

When the vehicle has left the gravity well, it is traveling at a speed
 

For the case where the added impulse  Δv is small compared to escape velocity, the 1 can be ignored, and the effective Δv of the impulsive burn can be seen to be multiplied by a factor of simply
  
and one gets
  ≈ 

Similar effects happen in closed and hyperbolic orbits.

Parabolic example

If the vehicle travels at velocity v at the start of a burn that changes the velocity by Δv, then the change in specific orbital energy (SOE) due to the new orbit is
 

Once the spacecraft is far from the planet again, the SOE is entirely kinetic, since gravitational potential energy approaches zero. Therefore, the larger the v at the time of the burn, the greater the final kinetic energy, and the higher the final velocity.

The effect becomes more pronounced the closer to the central body, or more generally, the deeper in the gravitational field potential in which the burn occurs, since the velocity is higher there.

So if a spacecraft is on a parabolic flyby of Jupiter with a periapsis velocity of 50 km/s and performs a 5 km/s burn, it turns out that the final velocity change at great distance is 22.9 km/s, giving a multiplication of the burn by 4.58 times.

Paradox
It may seem that the rocket is getting energy for free, which would violate conservation of energy. However, any gain to the rocket's kinetic energy is balanced by a relative decrease in the kinetic energy the exhaust is left with (the kinetic energy of the exhaust may still increase, but it does not increase as much). Contrast this to the situation of static firing, where the speed of the engine is fixed at zero. This means that its kinetic energy does not increase at all, and all the chemical energy released by the fuel is converted to the exhaust's kinetic energy (and heat).

At very high speeds the mechanical power imparted to the rocket can exceed the total power liberated in the combustion of the propellant; this may also seem to violate conservation of energy. But the propellants in a fast-moving rocket carry energy not only chemically, but also in their own kinetic energy, which at speeds above a few kilometres per second exceed the chemical component. When these propellants are burned, some of this kinetic energy is transferred to the rocket along with the chemical energy released by burning.

The Oberth effect can therefore partly make up for what is extremely low efficiency early in the rocket's flight when it is moving only slowly. Most of the work done by a rocket early in flight is "invested" in the kinetic energy of the propellant not yet burned, part of which they will release later when they are burned.

See also

Bi-elliptic transfer
Gravity assist
Propulsive efficiency

References

External links
Oberth effect
Explanation of the effect by Geoffrey Landis.

Rocket propulsion, classical relativity, and the Oberth effect

Animation (MP4) of the Oberth effect in orbit from the Blanco and Mungan paper cited above.

Aerospace engineering
Rocketry
Astrodynamics